The Girl's uneven bars event final for the 2014 Summer Youth Olympics took place on 23 August at the Nanjing Olympic Sports Center Gymnasium.

Medalists

Qualification

The top eight gymnasts from qualification advanced into the final.

Final

Reserves
The following gymnasts were reserves for the uneven bars final.

References

Gymnastics at the 2014 Summer Youth Olympics